Mikael Koloyan (born June 21, 1983 in Yerevan, Armenian SSR) is an Armenian swimmer. He competed at the 2008 Summer Olympics in the men's 100 metre freestyle. Koloyan finished in 56th place overall in the heats. He competed at the 2012 Summer Olympics in the men's 100 metre freestyle. Koloyan finished in 45th place overall in the heats.

References

External links
 
 
 

1983 births
Living people
Sportspeople from Yerevan
Armenian male freestyle swimmers
Olympic swimmers of Armenia
Swimmers at the 2008 Summer Olympics
Swimmers at the 2012 Summer Olympics